Barabanov (from барабан meaning drum) is a Russian masculine surname, its feminine counterpart is Barabanova. It may refer to
Alexander Barabanov (born 1994), Russian ice hockey player
Vasily Barabanov (1900–1964), Soviet NKVD officer

Russian-language surnames